Georges Buckley (born 23 April 1974) is a Peruvian international referee.

Buckley became a FIFA referee in 2006. He has refereed at 2014 FIFA World Cup qualifiers, beginning with the match between Venezuela and Bolivia.

References

1974 births
Living people
Peruvian football referees